Girka (Arabic and Ajami غرك) is a village in Kaita Local Government Katsina State, Nigeria.

The word 'Girka' in Hausa may literally mean 'to base (something on).' It may also mean 'the spiritual activities of Bori.' The latter meaning has nothing to do with Girka village etymologically nor historically.

Girka

'Sauri' is the title of Maigari (the Village Head). This title is derived from a Hausa word 'hasten' (to move or travel hurriedly). There was Sauri Isa who ruled between 1945 and 1984 and now his son has been leading the traditional affairs of the village for nearly four decades.

Centuries after its establishment, there are still several historical sites in Girka such as a magic tree, which people around it believe it has some jinns that can frighten anyone who dares go near it at noon. There are also the remnants of 'Girka Pond' that used to be a large pond where the Sarkin Sulluɓawa (the mayor of  Kaita), would annually go for regal fishing. There are some smaller hamlets under Girka such as Maƙaurachi, Tarkama, Jankerma, Allemi and many more scattered hamlets. Kaita local authority has built many primary schools in Girka village and its hamlets. Some international organisations such as UNICEF and USAID have assisted in either building new schools or renovating the old ones.

In 2009, Kaita local government has built a junior secondary school in Girka village. This allows hundreds of children to avoid travelling three or more miles everyday to attend secondary school classes in either Kaita or Dankaba village.

Girka people are mostly farmers but they also engage themselves in other small scale businesses.

There are still a few Kaita Local Government councillors from Girka village.

References

Populated places in Katsina State